Habibun Nahar (born 18 September 1954) is a Bangladesh Awami League politician and the incumbent Jatiya Sangsad member from Bagerhat-3 constituency and the Deputy Minister of Environment, Forest and Climate Change.

Career
Nahar was nominated to contest the Bagerhat-3 in May 2018 by Bangladesh Awami League. The seat fell vacant following the resignation of the then Member of Parliament and her husband, Talukder Abdul Khaleque, to contest the Khulna Mayoral Election. She was elected to Parliament on 4 June 2018 uncontested.

References

1954 births
Living people
Awami League politicians
9th Jatiya Sangsad members
10th Jatiya Sangsad members
11th Jatiya Sangsad members